The term Lacrimal or lachrymal, may refer to:

Anatomy
 Lacrimal apparatus
 Lacrimal artery
 Lacrimal bone
 Lacrimal canaliculi (singular: canaliculus), also known as Lacrimal ducts
 Lacrimal fossa (disambiguation)
 Lacrimal fluid, see Tears
 Lacrimal gland
 Lacrimal groove, also known as Lacrimal sulcus
 Lacrimal hamulus
 Lacrimal lake
 Lacrimal nerve
 Lacrimal papilla
 Lacrimal punctum
 Lacrimal sac
 Lacrimal secretion, see Tears
 Lacrimal tubercle
 Nasolacrimal duct

Typography
 A type of stroke ending

See also
 Lacrima (disambiguation)